
Year 674 (DCLXXIV) was a common year starting on Sunday (link will display the full calendar) of the Julian calendar. The denomination 674 for this year has been used since the early medieval period, when the Anno Domini calendar era became the prevalent method in Europe for naming years.

Events 
 By place 

 Byzantine Empire 
 Siege of Constantinople: The Arab fleet enters the Sea of Marmara and appears before the southern walls of Constantinople, in an attempt to blockade the Byzantine capital.
 April – A Muslim expeditionary force disembarks on the Thracian shore (near Hebdomon), and lays siege to the massive Theodosian Walls, on the landward side to the west.
 Summer – Abu Ayyub al-Ansari, companion and standard-bearer of Muhammad, is killed during the first attempt of the siege of the city (approximate date).
 Winter – Arab forces under Yazid (son of caliph Muawiyah I) retire to Cyzicus (Turkey). For the next 4 years the Arab fleet installs a loose blockade around Constantinople.

 Europe 
 The Muslim-Arabs raid Crete, killing and enslaving many soldiers. (approximate date).

 Britain 
 King Ecgfrith of Northumbria defeats a coalition led by the Mercians. He annexes the region of Lindsey (Lincolnshire).
 King Æscwine succeeds his father Cenfus as ruler of Wessex (approximate date). 

 Asia 
 King Vikramaditya I of Chalukya defeats the Pallavan army in battle, and destroys its capital Kanchi (modern India). 
 In Korea, Anapji is constructed by order of King Munmu of Silla.
 In Japan, Princess Ōku proceeds to the Ise Jingu.

 By topic 

 Religion 
 Æthelthryth, former queen of Northumbria, gives large areas of land to bishop Wilfrid to found Hexham Abbey.
 The Monkwearmouth monastery is founded by Benedict Biscop in Northumbria.
 The first glass windows are placed in English churches (approximate date).

Births 
 Poppo, king (duke) of Frisia (d. 734)
 Sulayman ibn Abd al-Malik, Muslim caliph (approximate date)

Deaths 
 Abu Ayyub al-Ansari, friend (sahabah) of Muhammad (approximate date)
 Hassan ibn Thabit, Arab poet and companion of Muhammad
 Hongren, Chán (Buddhist) patriarch of the Tang Dynasty (b. 601) 
 Seaxburh, queen of Wessex (approximate date)

References